Saringkan Promsupa (born 29 March 1997) is a Thai professional footballer who plays as a centre-back for Thai League 1 club Sukhothai.

Club career

Rayong FC 
Born in Sisaket, Thailand, Saringkan joined Rayong FC's youth setup in 2015 by the club's trial, after impressing in the COCA-COLA Cup 2015, he signed a new deal with the club.

In 2015, without any minute in professional level, he made his professional debut, starting in a 2–3 loss against Ratchaburi Mitr Phol FC for the Toyota League Cup 2015.

Muangthong United 
On 29 June 2018, Saringkan signed for Thai League 1 club, Muangthong United.

International career 
Saringkarn earned his first cap for the Thailand under-19 squad on 24 August 2015, starting in the 1–1 draw against Laos in 2015 AFF U-19 Youth Championship game. He was part of the victorious under-19 side at the AFF U-19 Youth Championship in Laos under Anurak Srikerd.

Selected for the Thailand under-23 squad in the 2017 Southeast Asian Games by manager Worrawoot Srimaka, Saringkarn played all seven times for the champions.

Saringkarn scored his first international goal on 9 December 2017, netting in a 2–1 win against Japan U23 squad. In the M-150 Cup tournament he was called up by manager Zoran Janković and squad for the 2018 AFC U-23 Championship in China.

International goals

U23

Honours

International
Thailand U-23
 SEA Games  Gold Medal (1): 2017
 AFF U-22 Youth Championship: 2019: Runner-up

Thailand U-19
 AFF U-19 Youth Championship 
  Winners (1) : 2015

Individual
 AFF U-22 Youth Championship: 2019: Top scorer (Shared)

References

External links
 
Saringkan Promsupa at soccerway.com

1997 births
Living people
Saringkan Promsupa
Saringkan Promsupa
Association football defenders
Saringkan Promsupa
Saringkan Promsupa
Saringkan Promsupa
Saringkan Promsupa
Saringkan Promsupa
Saringkan Promsupa
Footballers at the 2018 Asian Games
Saringkan Promsupa
Southeast Asian Games medalists in football
Competitors at the 2017 Southeast Asian Games
Saringkan Promsupa
Competitors at the 2019 Southeast Asian Games